Milka – A Film About Taboos is a 1980 Finnish drama film directed by Rauni Mollberg. It was entered into the 31st Berlin International Film Festival.

Plot
Milka is a 14-year-old still childlike girl who lives with her mother in a tiny isolated community in Northern Finland. The girl misses her dead father and prays God to show her what love is. The mother employs a man nicknamed Christ-Devil to help in the hay making. He stays in the house and courts both the mother and daughter. Later he vanishes unexpectedly, and the mother, who wished to marry him, notices that Milka is pregnant by him.

Cast
 Irma Huntus as Milka Sierkkiniemi
 Leena Suomu as Anna Sierkkiniemi
 Matti Turunen as Ojanen, 'Kristus-Perkele'
 Eikka Lehtonen as Cantor Malmström
 Esa Niemelä as Auno Laanila
 Hellin Auvinen-Salmi as Villager
 Sirkka Metsäsaari as Mother Laanila
 Ulla Tapaninen as Ojanen's woman friend
 Toivo Tuomainen as Villager
 Tauno Lehtihalmes as Dean

Production
Director Rauni Mollberg used amateurs. Irma Huntus, a 17-year-old school girl, was cast in the title role. She had several naked scenes. These shots confused her life in the small village where she returned after the filming was over. Helena Ylänen wrote in the newspaper Helsingin Sanomat, that Mollberg had "unleashed his fascination with the white naked human flesh. He makes a number of excuses to undress people, in particular the undeveloped girl's body of Milka."

References

External links

1980 films
1980s Finnish-language films
1980 drama films
Films directed by Rauni Mollberg
Finnish drama films